The 1937 Toronto Argonauts season was the 51st season for the team since the franchise's inception in 1873. The team finished in first place in the Interprovincial Rugby Football Union with a 5–1 record and qualified for the playoffs for the second consecutive season. The Argonauts defeated the Ottawa Rough Riders in a two-game total-points IRFU Final series before winning the Eastern Final over the Sarnia Imperials. The Argonauts faced the Winnipeg Blue Bombers in the 25th Grey Cup game, which was the first of many meetings by the two franchises in the championship game. The Argonauts won the franchise's fourth Grey Cup championship by a score of 4–3, which ties for the lowest scoring Grey Cup game ever.

Preseason

Regular season

Standings

Schedule

Postseason

Grey Cup

December 10 @ Varsity Stadium (Attendance: 11,522)

References

Toronto Argonauts seasons
Grey Cup championship seasons